Dunsop Bridge is a bridge in the English village of the same name. The structure, which dates to the early 19th century, crosses the River Dunsop. A Grade II listed structure, it is in sandstone, and consists of a single segmental arch with a string course and a solid rounded parapet.

See also
Listed buildings in Bowland Forest High

References

Grade II listed buildings in Lancashire
Bridges in Lancashire
Stone bridges in England
Road bridges in England
Bridges completed in the 19th century
19th-century establishments in England